Karyolysis (from Greek κάρυον karyon—kernel, seed, or nucleus), and λύσις lysis from λύειν lyein, "to separate") is the complete dissolution of the chromatin of a dying cell due to the enzymatic degradation by endonucleases. The whole cell will eventually stain uniformly with eosin after karyolysis. It is usually associated with karyorrhexis and occurs mainly as a result of necrosis, while in apoptosis after karyorrhexis the nucleus usually dissolves into apoptotic bodies.

Disintegration of the cytoplasm, pyknosis of the nuclei, and karyolysis of the nuclei of scattered transitional cells may be seen in urine from healthy individuals as well as in urine containing malignant cells. Cells with an attached tag of partially preserved cytoplasm were initially described by Papanicolaou and are sometimes called comet or decoy cells. They may have some of the characteristics of malignancy, and it is therefore important that they be recognized for what they are.

Additional images

See also 
Apoptosis
Necrosis
Pyknosis
Karyorrhexis

References

Cellular processes
Cellular senescence
Programmed cell death